In sociology, anomie is a social condition defined by an uprooting or breakdown of any moral values, standards or guidance for individuals to follow. Anomie is believed to possibly evolve from conflict of belief systems and causes breakdown of social bonds between an individual and the community (both economic and primary socialization). An example is alienation in a person that can progress into a dysfunctional inability to integrate within normative situations of their social world such as finding a job, achieving success in relationships, etc.

The term, commonly understood to mean normlessness, is believed to have been popularized by French sociologist Émile Durkheim in his influential book Suicide (1897). Émile Durkheim suggested that Protestants exhibited a greater degree of anomie than Catholics. However, Durkheim first introduced the concept of anomie in his 1893 work The Division of Labour in Society. Durkheim never used the term normlessness; rather, he described anomie as "derangement," and "an insatiable will." Durkheim used the term "the malady of the infinite" because desire without limit can never be fulfilled; it only becomes more intense.

For Durkheim, anomie arises more generally from a mismatch between personal or group standards and wider social standards; or from the lack of a social ethic, which produces moral deregulation and an absence of legitimate aspirations. This is a nurtured condition:

History 
In 1893, Durkheim introduced the concept of anomie to describe the mismatch of collective guild labour to evolving societal needs when the guild was homogeneous in its constituency. He equated homogeneous (redundant) skills to mechanical solidarity whose inertia hindered adaptation. He contrasted this with the self-regulating behaviour of a division of labour based on differences in constituency, equated to organic solidarity, whose lack of inertia made it sensitive to needed changes.

Durkheim observed that the conflict between the evolved organic division of labour and the homogeneous mechanical type was such that one could not exist in the presence of the other. When solidarity is organic, anomie is impossible, as sensitivity to mutual needs promotes evolution in the division of labour:Durkheim contrasted the condition of anomie as being the result of a malfunction of organic solidarity after the transition to mechanical solidarity:

Durkheim's use of anomie was in regards to the phenomenon of industrialization—mass-regimentation that could not adapt due to its own inertia. More specifically, its resistance to change causes disruptive cycles of collective behavior (e.g. economics) due to the necessity of a prolonged buildup of sufficient force or momentum to overcome the inertia.

Later in 1897, in his studies of suicide, Durkheim associated anomie to the influence of a lack of norms or norms that were too rigid. However, such normlessness or norm-rigidity was a symptom of anomie, caused by the lack of differential adaptation that would enable norms to evolve naturally due to self-regulation, either to develop norms where none existed or to change norms that had become rigid and obsolete. Durkheim found that Protestant communities have noticeably higher suicide rates than Catholic ones, and justified it with individualism and lack of social cohesion prevalent amongst Protestants, creating poorly integrated society and making Protestants less likely to develop close communal ties that would be crucial in times of hardship. Conversely, he states that the Catholic faith binds individuals stronger together and builds strong social ties, decreasing the risk of suicide and alienation. In this, Durkheim argued that religion is much more important than culture in regards to anomic suicide. This allowed Durkheim to successfully tie social cohesion to suicide rates:

In 1938, Robert K. Merton linked anomie with deviance, arguing that the discontinuity between culture and structure have the dysfunctional consequence of leading to deviance within society. He described 5 types of deviance in terms of the acceptance or rejection of social goals and the institutionalized means of achieving them.

Etymology 

The Greeks distinguished between nomos, and arché. For example, a monarch is a single ruler but he may still be subject to, and not exempt from, the prevailing laws, i.e. nomos. In the original city state democracy, the majority rule was an aspect of arché because it was a rule-based, customary system, which may or may not make laws, i.e. nomos. Thus, the original meaning of anomie defined anything or anyone against or outside the law, or a condition where the current laws were not applied resulting in a state of illegitimacy or lawlessness.

The contemporary English understanding of the word anomie can accept greater flexibility in the word "norm", and some have used the idea of normlessness to reflect a similar situation to the idea of anarchy. However, as used by Émile Durkheim and later theorists, anomie is a reaction against or a retreat from the regulatory social controls of society, and is a completely separate concept from anarchy, which consists of the absence of the roles of rulers and submitted.

Social disorder 

Nineteenth-century French pioneer sociologist Émile Durkheim borrowed the term anomie from French philosopher Jean-Marie Guyau. Durkheim used it in his influential book Suicide (1897) in order to outline the social (and not individual) causes of suicide, characterized by a rapid change of the standards or values of societies (often erroneously referred to as normlessness), and an associated feeling of alienation and purposelessness. He believed that anomie is common when the surrounding society has undergone significant changes in its economic fortunes, whether for better or for worse and, more generally, when there is a significant discrepancy between the ideological theories and values commonly professed and what was actually achievable in everyday life. This was contrary to previous theories on suicide which generally maintained that suicide was precipitated by negative events in a person's life and their subsequent depression.

In Durkheim's view, traditional religions often provided the basis for the shared values which the anomic individual lacks. Furthermore, he argued that the division of labor that had been prevalent in economic life since the Industrial Revolution led individuals to pursue egoistic ends rather than seeking the good of a larger community. Robert King Merton also adopted the idea of anomie to develop strain theory, defining it as the discrepancy between common social goals and the legitimate means to attain those goals. In other words, an individual suffering from anomie would strive to attain the common goals of a specific society yet would not be able to reach these goals legitimately because of the structural limitations in society. As a result, the individual would exhibit deviant behavior. Friedrich Hayek notably uses the word anomie with this meaning.

According to one academic survey, psychometric testing confirmed a link between anomie and academic dishonesty among university students, suggesting that universities needed to foster codes of ethics among students in order to curb it. In another study, anomie was seen as a "push factor" in tourism.

As an older variant, the 1913 Webster's Dictionary reports use of the word anomie as meaning "disregard or violation of the law." However, anomie as a social disorder is not to be confused with anarchy: proponents of anarchism claim that anarchy does not necessarily lead to anomie and that hierarchical command actually increases lawlessness. Some anarcho-primitivists argue that complex societies, particularly industrial and post-industrial societies, directly cause conditions such as anomie by depriving the individual of self-determination and a relatively small reference group to relate to, such as the band, clan or tribe.

In 2003, José Soltero and Romeo Saravia analyzed the concept of anomie in regards to Protestantism and Catholicism in El Salvador. Massive displacement of population in the 1970s, economic and political crises as well as cycles of violence are credited with radically changing the religious composition of the country, rendering it one of the most Protestant countries in Latin America. According to Seltero and Saravia, the rise of Protestantism is conversationally claimed to be caused Catholic failure to "address the spiritual needs of the poor" and the Protestant "deeper quest for salvation, liberation, and eternal life". However, their research does not support these claims, and showed that Protestantism isn't more popular amongst the poor. Their findings do confirm the assumptions of anomie, with Catholic communities of El Salvador enjoying high social cohesion, while the Protestant communities have been associated with poorer social integration, internal migration and tend to be places deeply affected by the Salvadoran Civil War. Additionally, Seltero and Saravia found that Salvadoran Catholicism is tied to social activism, Liberation Theology and the political left, as opposed to the "right wing political orientation, or at least a passive, personally inward orientation, expressed by some Protestant churches". They conclude that their research contradicts the theory that Protestantism responds to the spiritual needs of the poor more adequately than Catholicism, while also disproving the claim that Protestantism appeals more to women:

The study by Soltero and Saravia has also found a link between Protestantism and no access to healthcare:

Synnomie
Freda Adler coined synnomie as the opposite of anomie. Using Émile Durkheim's concept of social solidarity and collective consciousness, Adler defined synnomie as "a congruence of norms to the point of harmonious accommodation."

Adler described societies in a synnomie state as "characterized by norm conformity, cohesion, intact social controls and norm integration." Social institutions such as the family, religion and communities, largely serve as sources of norms and social control to maintain a synnomic society.

In culture 

In Albert Camus's existentialist novel The Stranger, Meursault—the bored, alienated protagonist—struggles to construct an individual system of values as he responds to the disappearance of the old. He exists largely in a state of anomie, as seen from the apathy evinced in the opening lines: "" ("Today mum died. Or maybe yesterday, I don't know").

Fyodor Dostoyevsky expresses a similar concern about anomie in his novel The Brothers Karamazov. The Grand Inquisitor remarks that in the absence of God and immortal life, everything would be lawful. In other words, that any act becomes thinkable, that there is no moral compass, which leads to apathy and detachment.

In The Ink Black Heart of the Cormoran Strike novels, written by J.K. Rowling under the pseudonym Robert Galbraith, the main antagonist goes by the online handle of "Anomie."

See also

References

Sources 
 Durkheim, Émile. 1893. The Division of Labour in Society.
 Marra, Realino. 1987. Suicidio, diritto e anomia. Immagini della morte volontaria nella civiltà occidentale. Napoli: Edizioni Scientifiche Italiane.
 —— 1989. "Geschichte und aktuelle Problematik des Anomiebegriffs." Zeitschrift für Rechtssoziologie 11(1):67–80.
 Orru, Marco. 1983. "The Ethics of Anomie: Jean Marie Guyau and Émile Durkheim." British Journal of Sociology 34(4):499–518.
 Riba, Jordi. 1999. La Morale Anomique de Jean-Marie Guyau. L'Harmattan. .

External links 

 Deflem, Mathieu. 2015. "Anomie: History of the Concept." pp. 718–721 in International Encyclopedia of Social and Behavioral Sciences, Second Edition (Volume 1), edited by James D. Wright. Oxford, UK: Elsevier.
 "Anomie" discussed at the Émile Durkheim Archive.
 Featherstone, Richard, and Mathieu Deflem. 2003. "Anomie and Strain: Context and Consequences of Merton's Two Theories." Sociological Inquiry 73(4):471-489, 2003.

Deviance (sociology)
Émile Durkheim
Social philosophy
Sociological terminology
Sociological theories